Henry Wadsworth "Eskie" Clark ( April 11, 1899 – March 23, 1976) was an American college football player and coach. He served as the head football coach at Trinity College in Hartford, Connecticut for one season, in 1925, compiling a record of 1–5. Clark was the athletic director at Lafayette College in Easton, Pennsylvania from 1935 to 1944.

Clark was born in Wrangell, Alaska. After attending Phillips Exeter Academy, he played football as a center and was a shot putter on the track and field team at Harvard University, from which he graduated in 1923. Clark died on March 23, 1976, in Silver Spring, Maryland.

Head coaching record

References

External links
 

1899 births
1976 deaths
American football centers
American male shot putters
Harvard Crimson football coaches
Harvard Crimson football players
Harvard Crimson men's track and field athletes
Lafayette Leopards athletic directors
Stanford Cardinal football players
Trinity Bantams football coaches
Phillips Exeter Academy alumni
People from Wrangell, Alaska